Losynivka is an urban-type settlement in Nizhyn Raion, Chernihiv Oblast, Ukraine. It hosts the administration of Losynivka settlement hromada, one of the hromadas of Ukraine. Population:

Economy

Transportation
Losynivka has access to the highway connecting Pryluky via Nizhyn with Highway M02.

People
The singer Alla Kudlai was born in Losynivka.

References

Nezhinsky Uyezd
Urban-type settlements in Nizhyn Raion